The 2011 Mirabella Cup was the first edition of a football (soccer) knockout-cup competition held between men's clubs in Victoria, Australia in 2011, the annual edition of the Dockerty Cup. It was to be unique in Australian football in that the competition was to integrate clubs from the national top level league, the A-League, with the state system below. However, the Football Federation Australia later withdrew their permission for Melbourne Victory and Melbourne Heart to take part in the competition while the first rounds were already ongoing, citing confusion of fans in marketing an as yet unannounced national knockout cup competition, which the FFA described in a press announcement announcing their reversal as still being in a stage of consideration, and not yet having a viable plan.

Northcote City SC defeated Melbourne Knights in the final to win their first Victorian top-level silverware.

The Regional Challenge Cup was won by Cobram Victory.

Teams

First round Playoffs
Round 1 will contain clubs below State League 1. Clubs will play teams in their Zones and some teams will have a bye which automatically puts them into the second round. The draw was held on 8 March 2011 at 7pm, and broadcast live by webcam.

Central Draw

Eastern Draw

North-West Draw

North East Draw

Northern Draw

South-East Draw

 

Southern Draw

Wimmera South Coast Draw

Western Draw

Second round Playoffs

Third round Playoffs

Zone Semi-finals
The draw for the Zone Semi-finals took place on 14 April 2011. This round saw the introduction of the Alanic Victorian Premier League teams, with the exception of Richmond SC, and Victorian State League 1 teams. These 23 (seeded) teams were paired off with 23 of the 25 (unseeded) teams who progressed through the Zone Playoffs stage, with Malvern City and Fortuna 60 SC playing each other in the 24th match. This stage contained 48 teams in total. Green Gully Cavaliers set the record for most goals in a match, in the short history of the competition. The side comprehensively beat Regional side Mildura United SC 18 – 0 after leading 9 – 0 at the half.

Zone Finals
The lowest ranked team left in the competition is North Sunshine Eagles of the Victorian Men's Provisional League 1 (North-West), the fifth tier of Victorian state football. All 11 VPL clubs in the tournament survived their first round matches.

Super 12
The draw for the Super 12 round was held on 17 June 2011. 8 of the 11 VPL clubs survived their second round matches. The lowest ranked club remaining in the tournament is Cobram Victory, from the regional Goulburn North East Football Association.

Quarter-final Series
After the removal of Melbourne Heart and Melbourne Victory, who were set to debut in the Quarter-finals, the structure of the tournament was revised. Instead of a straight knockout – as was previously planned – the six teams will be placed into two round-robin tournament groups of three, with the top two teams from each group to advance to the Semi-finals. The draw for this stage, as well as the announcement of the format, was held on 22 July.

Pool A

Pool B

Semi-finals

Regional Challenge Cup

Final

References

Soccer cup competitions in Australia
Soccer in Victoria (Australia)